Heart String is the fifth studio album by Earl Klugh released in 1979.

Track listing 
All tracks written by Earl Klugh except where noted.
"Heart String" – 6:23
"I'll See You Again" – 5:52
"Acoustic Lady, Part 1 & 2" – 7:43
"Spanish Night" – 3:18
"Pretty World" (Antonio Adolfo, Alan Bergman, Tiberio Gaspar)– 4:47
"Waiting for Cathy" – 2:50
"Rayna" – 5:15
"Heart String (Reprise)" – 4:03

Personnel
Earl Klugh - acoustic guitar, steel guitar
Phil Upchurch - electric guitar
Charles Meeks, Hubie Crawford, Roland Wilson - bass
Greg Phillinganes, Mickie Roquemore, Darryl Dybka - keyboards
Victor Lewis, Gene Dunlap - drums
Ralph MacDonald - percussion
David Nadien - concertmaster

Charts

References 

1978 albums
Earl Klugh albums
Albums arranged by David Matthews (keyboardist)
Albums produced by Michael Cuscuna
Albums recorded at Electric Lady Studios
Blue Note Records albums